Pacifica may refer to:

Art
 Pacifica (statue), a 1938 statue by Ralph Stackpole for the Golden Gate International Exposition

Places
 Pacifica, California, a city in the United States
 Pacifica Pier, a fishing pier
 Pacifica, a conceivable union of Guam, the Northern Marianas, and a number of the former Trust Territories of the United States in the central Pacific Ocean

Media
 Pacifica Radio, a non-commercial radio network in the United States, founded on the principles of pacifism
 Federal Communications Commission v. Pacifica Foundation, a landmark court case for the regulation of indecency in U.S. broadcasting
 Pacifica, a newsletter published by the Association of Pacific Coast Geographers
 Pacifica (journal), theological journal

Music
 Pacifica (Fred Frith album), 1998
 Pacifica (The Presets album)
 Yamaha Pacifica, a model of electric guitar
 Pacifica Quartet, an American string quartet

Fictional
 Pacifica, a planet in "Manhunt" (Star Trek: The Next Generation)
 Pacifica Casull, a character in the Scrapped Princess anime
 Pacifica, a state in the Crimson Skies universe
 Pacifica, a state in the video game Shattered Union
 Pacifica, a bonus world in the Game Boy Advance version of Donkey Kong Country 3: Dixie Kong's Double Trouble!
 Pacifica, a nation that rivals the eastern alliance in the video game Fracture
 Pacifica, an underwater city in the TV series Stingray
 Pacifica, an airline in Flight Simulator X
 Pacifica, an underwater city in the 1971 TV movie City Beneath the Sea
 Pacifica Northwest, a character from the 2012 Disney Channel original TV series Gravity Falls

Other uses
 Chrysler Pacifica, a crossover sport utility vehicle and a minivan model
 Gavia pacifica, a species of loon
 Pacifica, a division of French insurance company Crédit Agricole
 Pacifica, the codename for computer x86 virtualization technology from AMD, currently known as AMD-V
 Pacifica Graduate Institute, an educational institution offering degrees in psychology, mythological studies, and the humanities
 Pacifica Forum, a controversial discussion group based in Eugene, Oregon

See also 
 Pasifika (disambiguation)
 Pacifika, a Canadian world music group
 Pacifica High School (disambiguation)